Six Mile Creek Stage Station Historic District is the site of a stagecoach station and ranch on the Santa Fe Trail in western Morris County, Kansas. After the stagecoach station at Diamond Spring was destroyed, a new station was built at Six Mile Creek in 1863. The station lasted until later in the 1860s, when new railroad construction made the stage line obsolete. Charley Owens began a ranch at the site in 1866, and while his ranch only lasted two years, the site was sporadically used for ranching and farming into the twentieth century. In addition to the ruined stage station, the site includes the remnants of a barn, blacksmith shop, corral, and well, along with several ruts from the trail.

The site was added to the National Register of Historic Places on May 11, 1995.

References

External links

		
National Register of Historic Places in Morris County, Kansas
Stagecoach stations on the National Register of Historic Places
Ranches on the National Register of Historic Places
Stagecoach stations in Kansas
Ranches in Kansas
Santa Fe Trail
Buildings and structures completed in 1863